Kadek Dimas Satria Adiputra (born on 24 September 2001) is an Indonesian professional footballer who plays as a striker for Liga 1 club Bali United.

Career

Youth

Dimas played for the youth academy of Bali United.

Bali United
On 23 July 2020, Dimas officially signed his first professional contract with Liga 1 club Bali United after being promoted from the youth team. Dimas made his first-team and league debut for Bali United in a 4–0 win against Persebaya on 18 February 2023 as a substitute for Ilija Spasojević in the 86th minute. He made his league debut for Bali United in 2023.

PSIM

In 2021, he was sent on loan to PSIM.

International

He has been called up for Indonesia national under-19 football team.

Career statistics

Club

Honours

Club 
Bali United
 Liga 1: 2021–22

Individual
 2019 Liga 1 U-18 top goalscorers

References

External links
I Kadek Dimas Satria Adiputra at PSSI Official Website
Kadek Dimas at Bali United Official Website

2001 births
Living people
People from Denpasar
Indonesian footballers
Liga 1 (Indonesia) players
Association football fullbacks
Sportspeople from Bali
Bali United F.C. players
Balinese people